Umberto Calcagno (born 6 September 1970 in Chiavari) is an Italian former professional footballer who played as a midfielder. He played in Serie A for Sampdoria.

Honours
Sampdoria
 Serie A champion: 1990–91

References

1970 births
Living people
People from Chiavari
Italian footballers
Association football midfielders
Serie A players
Serie C players
U.C. Sampdoria players
Giulianova Calcio players
Rimini F.C. 1912 players
Benevento Calcio players
U.S. Avellino 1912 players
A.S. Gualdo Casacastalda players
A.S.D. Martina Calcio 1947 players
U.S. Castrovillari Calcio players
Sportspeople from the Province of Genoa
Footballers from Liguria